Family allocations make up the family-oriented sector of the French social security system, through a network known as the Caisse nationale des allocations familiales National Office for Family Allocations or CNAF and the 101 Caisse d'allocations familiales (Family Allocations Office, or CAF).

The institution serves more than 10 million beneficiaries.



Background
It was formalized by the decree of October 4, 1945.

The allowances
Family benefits are not taxable, but subject to the contribution for the reimbursement of social debt with the exception of social minima such as RSA, AAH and formerly API and RMI. Their amount is set by legislative texts as a percentage of the monthly basis for calculating Family Allowances.

They are in principle unassignable and unseizable except:

in the event of fraud or false declaration;
for the recovery of maintenance claims (canteen costs in particular);
for the recovery of healthcare costs (hospitalization for example);
regarding the housing allowance where benefits can be paid directly to the lessor in certain cases.

Without exception, family benefits are paid monthly and in arrears and are due from the first day of the calendar month following the month in which the conditions for entitlement are met. Subject to the rules specific to each service, the prescription is biennial. The end of entitlement is fixed on the first day of the calendar month during which the conditions for opening the entitlement cease to be met, except in the event of death (in this case, the termination of entitlement is the month following the death).

In 2007, the family allowance funds paid the following benefits:

Birth, Adoption, Childcare

Allowance for the birth of a child (1710,49€ once)
 Allowance for a young child (171,06€/month)
Adoption allowance
 Aid to the family to hire a licensed mother's assistant (between 374,12€ and 748,24€/month).
 Allowance for raising children at home (between 134,13€ and 530,72€/month)
 Parental education allowance (between 256€ and 350,92€/month)
	
Children

 Child benefit (between 119-152€/month, more for each child between the ages of 11-20)
 Familial complement (155€/month)
 Allowance for parental presence (39-47€/day + 101€/month)
	
Back to school

 Allowance for the new school year (286,01€, paid in September)

Housing

 Housing aid
 Personalised housing aid
 Bonus for moving house (898-973€, once)
 Aid for scholarship students who move house (300€, once)
 Loan for improvement works to home (1% interest loan, maximum 1067,14€)
	
The single or separated parent

Single parent allowance (between 52,90€ and 748,20€)
Family support allowance (83,76€ - 111,68€/month)
 Recovery of unpaid alimony (the CAF takes legal action to force the other parent to pay alimony)
	
The handicapped adult or child

 Allocation for the education of a handicapped child (between 119,72€ - 1999,82€/month)
 Allocation for handicapped adults (621,27€)

The minimum salary

 Revenu de solidarité active (RSA) since 1 June 2009 (440,86€ - 925,81€/month)
 Employment bonus: Prime for returning to work since 1er january 2016 (1000€, once)

References

External links
The website of the CAF and CNAF

Government of France